Bongiovanni is an Italian surname and may refer to:

People
 Horacio Bongiovanni (born 1950), Argentine former footballer
 Nino Bongiovanni (1911–2009), professional baseball player and manager
 Luigi Bongiovanni (1866–1941), Italian general
 Lydia Bongiovanni (1914–1998), Italian versatile athlete

Others
 asteroid 20590 Bongiovanni
 Bongiovanni (record label), Bologna, Italy
 :it:Bongiovanni, family name biography articles on Italian Wikipedia

Surnames of Italian origin